Caloptilia octopunctata is a species of moth of the family Gracillariidae. It is known from the Democratic Republic of Congo, Tanzania, Uganda, South Africa, India, Australia (New South Wales and Queensland), New Zealand and Indonesia.

The wingspan is 9–13 mm.

The larvae feed on Homalanthus species, Omalanthus populifolius, Sapium ellipticum, Sapium indicum and Sapium sebiferum. They mine the leaves of their host plant.

References

octopunctata
Moths of Asia
Moths of Africa
Moths of Oceania
Moths described in 1894